Trierarchuncus (meaning "captain hook," after its single-clawed hands) is a monotypic genus of alvarezsaurid theropod which includes a single species, Trierarchuncus prairiensis, which is known from fossils found in deposits of the Hell Creek Formation in Montana. It is the youngest known alvarezsaurid and one of the last non-avian dinosaurs, going extinct during the Cretaceous–Paleogene extinction event, which occurred approximately 66 million years ago.

Discovery and naming
The first remains ware discovered in Montana in 1980 and it was informally known as the "Hell Creek alvarezsaur". The then unnamed species was not mentioned again until it was mentioned briefly in the 2018 Society of Vertebrate Paleontology abstract book. The species and genus were scientifically described by Denver Fowler and colleagues in 2020 based on three claw phalanges from MD-I-2, including the holotype MOR 6622, the distal end of a radius and fragmentary metatarsal.

The first part of the generic name, Trierarch, means "triarch" (the title of captain of the trireme in classical Greece), while the second, uncus, is translated from Latin as "hook"; it can thus be translated as "captain hook", although its describers do not explicitly make the connection with the Peter Pan character. The specific name means "from the prairie" and refers to the plains of eastern Montana where the remains were discovered.

Description
Trierarchuncus was described by Fowler based upon several differences, especially on the three phalanges, the radius and the metatarsals. Trierarchuncus is known from its arms, feet and toes. Like its relatives, Trierarchuncus would have been feathered, with short arms bearing one clawed digit, a bird-like head and long legs.

Classification
Cladogram according to Fowler et al., 2020, with clade names added by definition:

Paleoecology

Trierarchuncus represents one of the few known alvarezsaurids from North America. At 66 million years old, it is the youngest known alvarezsaurid and is one of the youngest non-avian dinosaurs in general, like its contemporaries Tyrannosaurus and Triceratops. Additionally, another Hell Creek alvarezsaurid, called "Ornithomimus" minutus, is known, but Fowler et al. did not refer it to Trierarchuncus.

References 

Late Cretaceous dinosaurs of North America
Hell Creek fauna
Alvarezsaurids
Fossil taxa described in 2020